The United States House Financial Services Subcommittee on Digital Assets, Financial Technology and Inclusion is a subcommittee of the House Committee on Financial Services. The Subcommittee on Diversity and Inclusion was created for the 116th United States Congress by Chairwoman Maxine Waters. However, under Republican control during the 118th Congress, the subcommittee expanded its focus to include digital financing, including cryptocurrency.

Jurisdiction
From the committee rules of the 117th Congress:

The jurisdiction of the Subcommittee on Diversity and Inclusion includes —
 all matters related to diversity and inclusion within all the agencies, departments, programs, and entities within the jurisdiction of the Committee, including workforce diversity and inclusion, external or customer diversity and inclusion, and supplier diversity;
 the Offices of Minority and Women Inclusion within the federal financial agencies
 methods, initiatives, and measures to promote financial and economic inclusion for all consumers.

Members, 117th Congress

Historical membership rosters

116th Congress

References

External links
Official Homepage

FinServ Diversity and Inclusion